The Premier of Montserrat is the head of government of the British Overseas Territory of Montserrat. The Premier is appointed by the Governor of Montserrat on behalf of the monarch of the United Kingdom, currently King Charles III.

The current Premier of Montserrat is Easton Taylor-Farrell of the Movement for Change and Prosperity. The Premier is appointed by the Governor from among the members of the Legislative Assembly, which consists of nine elected members.

Between 1960 and 2011 the position was known as the Chief Minister of Montserrat, this changed on 27 September 2011 when the Montserrat Constitution Order 2010 took effect. The first Premier of Montserrat was Reuben Meade, who was also the last Chief Minister.

The Cabinet has replaced the Executive Council and consists of the Premier, the Attorney-General, the Financial Secretary, and three other ministers. One of the cabinet members aside from the Premier must be appointed deputy.

List of Premiers
Political parties

See also
 List of current heads of government in the United Kingdom and dependencies
 Chief Minister of Montserrat - title of the head of government prior to 2011

Government of Montserrat